Allantospermum borneense is a tree in the family Irvingiaceae. The specific epithet  is from the Latin meaning "of Borneo".

Description
The mostly smooth bark is pale brown with grey patches. The twigs are brown and slender. The flowers are white.

Distribution and habitat
Allantospermum borneense grows naturally in Peninsular Malaysia and Borneo. Its main habitat is mixed dipterocarp forest.

References

Irvingiaceae
Trees of Peninsular Malaysia
Trees of Borneo
Plants described in 1965